The insulin index of food represents how much it elevates the concentration of insulin in the blood during the two-hour period after the food is ingested. The index is similar to the glycemic index (GI) and glycemic load (GL), but rather than relying on blood glucose levels, the Insulin Index is based upon blood insulin levels. The Insulin Index represents a comparison of food portions with equal overall caloric content (250 kcal or 1000 kJ), while GI represents a comparison of portions with equal digestible carbohydrate content (typically 50 g) and the GL represents portions of a typical serving size for various foods. The Insulin Index can be more useful than either the glycemic index or the glycemic load because certain foods (e.g., lean meats and proteins) cause an insulin response despite there being no carbohydrates present, and some foods cause a disproportionate insulin response relative to their carbohydrate load.

Holt et al. have noted that the glucose and insulin scores of most foods are highly correlated, but high-protein foods and bakery products that are rich in fat and refined carbohydrates "elicit insulin responses that were disproportionately higher than their glycemic responses." They also conclude that insulin indices may be useful for dietary management and avoidance of non-insulin-dependent diabetes mellitus and hyperlipidemia.

Explanation of Index
The Insulin Index is not the same as a glycemic index (GI), which is based exclusively on the digestible carbohydrate content of food, and represents a comparison of foods in amounts with equal digestible carbohydrate content (typically 50 g). The insulin index compares foods in amounts with equal overall caloric content (240 kcal or 1000 kJ). Insulin indexes are scaled relative to white bread, while glycemic index scores nowadays are usually scaled with respect to pure glucose, although in the past white bread has been a reference point for GI measurements as well.
In the chart below, glycemic and insulin scores show the increase in the blood concentration of each. A higher satiety score indicates how much less was eaten from a buffet after participants ate the listed food.

Glucose (glycemic) and insulin scores were determined by feeding 1000 kilojoules (239 kilocalories) of the food to the participants and recording the area under the glucose/insulin curve for 120 minutes then dividing by the area under the glucose/insulin curve for white bread.  The result being that all scores are relative to white bread. The satiety score was determined by comparing how satiated participants felt within two hours after being fed a fixed number of calories (240 kilocalories) of a particular food while blindfolded (to ensure food appearance was not a factor), then dividing that number by how satiated the participants felt after eating white bread.
White bread serves as the baseline of 100. In other words, foods scoring higher than 100 are more satisfying than white bread and those under 100 are less satisfying. The satiety score was negatively correlated to the amount eaten by participants at a subsequent buffet.

± indicate uncertainty in the data.  For example 60 ± 12 means that there's a 95% chance the score is between 60-12 (48) and 60+12 (72), 60 being the highest probability assuming a bell curve.  In practice this means that if two foods have large uncertainty and have values close together then you don't really know which score is the higher.

See also
 Disposition index
 Glycemic index
 Glycemic load
 Insulin oscillations

References

External links
 

Nutrition
Diabetes